Erin Elizabeth McKee  is an American diplomat who is the current assistant administrator of the United States Agency for International Development for Europe and Eurasia. She served as the United States Ambassador to Papua New Guinea, Solomon Islands and Vanuatu from 2019 to 2022.

Early life and education
McKee is from California. She earned a Bachelor of Arts from the University of California, Davis, and an Master of Arts from University of Washington.  She speaks Russian, Spanish, and Indonesian.

Career
McKee early in her career worked for Morrison Knudsen, Inc.’s international mining division in the former Soviet Union. She then served as general manager and then executive director for Capital Investment Group's (CIG) Russia operations.

McKee joined the U.S. Foreign Service in 1995. McKee then served at USAID Missions in Kazakhstan, Iraq, Peru, Bolivia, Israel, and Russia. She later became Senior Deputy Assistant Administrator and Chief Human Capital Officer in the USAID Office of Human Capital and Talent Management, and Senior Deputy Assistant Administrator for the Bureau of Policy, Planning, and Learning at USAID headquarters in Washington, D.C. Before becoming ambassador, McKee was Mission Director of the United States Agency for International Development (USAID) in Indonesia.

Personal
McKee is married and has a daughter. She speaks Russian, Spanish, and Bahasa Indonesia.

See also

List of ambassadors of the United States

References

|-

|-

Living people
People of the United States Agency for International Development
Ambassadors of the United States to Papua New Guinea
Ambassadors of the United States to the Solomon Islands
Ambassadors of the United States to Vanuatu
Trump administration personnel
Biden administration personnel
University of California, Davis alumni
United States Department of State officials
United States Foreign Service personnel
21st-century American diplomats
American women ambassadors
Year of birth missing (living people)
21st-century American women
American women diplomats